Pleotrichophorus is a genus of true bugs belonging to the family Aphididae.

The species of this genus are found in Europe, Southeastern Asia and Northern America.

Species:
 Pleotrichophorus achilleae Holman, 1965 
 Pleotrichophorus ambrosiae Hille Ris Lambers, 1969

References

Aphididae
Hemiptera genera